Wiwibloggs is a fansite and YouTube channel focusing on the Eurovision Song Contest, launched in 2009 by journalist William Lee Adams. It has a seasonal audience, peaking at 250,000 page views per day during the week of Eurovision in May 2016, based on Google Analytics data.

History 
In April 2015, Wiwibloggs won Arts & Culture Blog of the Year at the National UK Blog Awards, recognising it as the top blog in the country across architecture, design, entertainment and music.

Later that month, William Lee Adams was the only Eurovision blogger to speak on a panel at the Eurovision Song Contest 60th Anniversary Conference in London. In the official programme for the event, the European Broadcasting Union described Wiwibloggs as the "most popular and innovative" Eurovision website. Adams has judged at national selections for a number of countries, among them Armenia (in 2017), Belarus (in 2020), Finland (every year between 2017 and 2021), Germany (as a member of the 100-member fan jury panel in 2019), Norway (in 2017 and 2018), Romania (in 2019, alongside fellow Wiwibloggs correspondent Deban Aderemi) and Spain (William Lee Addams as one of the members of the jury). Wiwibloggs staffers have also been among the jurors for selections in Latvia and Portugal. In some cases, their role as jurors in national selection finals has been criticized by local media.

During the Eurovision Song Contest 2016, Adams and Aderemi served as special guests on Studio Eurovision, the official Eurovision preview show by Swedish host broadcaster SVT. The show aired the hour before the Eurovision semi-finals and the final. Adams later hosted an official livestream for Israeli broadcaster Kan during the first semi-final of the 2019 contest, and he and Aderemi have also participated in Eurovision-related radio and web content for Germany and the United Kingdom (the latter's participation being organised by the BBC, of which Adams is an employee, specifically as the senior broadcast journalist at the BBC World Service). The Portuguese correspondent for the site, Bernardo Pereira, was also a member of American Portuguese-language radio station WJFD-FM's bilingual commentary team for the 2019 contest, and has provided pre- and post-show reports for RTP's annual Festival da Canção.

Adams had a cameo appearance as himself in Eurovision Song Contest: The Story of Fire Saga (2020). He had met the film's star and co-writer, Will Ferrell, two years earlier at the Eurovision Song Contest 2018 in Lisbon. In June 2021, Adams secured a book deal for his memoir Wild Dances, which explores his relationship with Eurovision and the "powerful joy, and surprising importance, of the song contest."

References

External links
Wiwibloggs.com

British music websites
Internet properties established in 2009
Eurovision Song Contest